Vincent Praplan (born June 10, 1994) is a Swiss professional ice hockey forward who is currently playing for Genève-Servette HC of the National League (NL).

Playing career
Praplan played youth hockey with HC Sierre and EHC Visp before joining the EHC Kloten organization as a 15-year old. He opted to play major junior hockey in North America, skating with the North Bay Battalion in the Ontario Hockey League for the 2013–14 season. Despite scoring 19 goals and 53 points in 61 games, Praplan went undrafted before returning to the NL with EHC Kloten for the following 2014–15 season.

In the midst of his second full season with Kloten in 2015–16, Praplan agreed to a two-year contract extension with Kloten on October 20, 2015.

Praplan participated in the Chicago Blackhawks' development camp in July 2017 and was invited to the San Jose Sharks prospect camp in September 2017.

On August 29, 2017, with one year remaining on his contract, Praplan agreed to a one-year contract extension with Kloten to stay with the team through the 2018–19 season. Both contracts contained NHL-out clauses for both the 2017–18 and 2018–19 seasons. On March 2, 2018, Praplan signed a one-year, entry-level contract with the San Jose Sharks of the National Hockey League (NHL). His contract with Kloten was immediately terminated once the team got relegated to the Swiss League at the end of the season.

After attending the San Jose Sharks 2018 training camp, Praplan was reassigned to make his North American debut with AHL affiliate, the San Jose Barracuda, to begin the 2018–19 season. While limited through injury to 27 games approaching the trade deadline, Praplan contributed with 16 points for the Barracuda, before he was traded by the Sharks to the Florida Panthers for future considerations on February 22, 2019.

On May 17, 2019, as an impending free agent from the Panthers, Praplan returned to his native Switzerland, joining SC Bern of the NL on a four-year deal through the 2022–23 season. Following a disappointing 2021–22 season, both SCB and Praplan decided to terminate his contract with the team.

On March 16, 2022, Praplan left SC Bern following their lowest finish since 1986 and joined Genève-Servette HC on a three-year deal through the 2024–25 season.

International play
Praplan first represented Switzerland at the junior level at the 2011 Ivan Hlinka Memorial Tournament and later at the World Junior Championships in 2014.

Praplan was added to the Swiss national team at the senior level in preparation for the 2017 IIHF World Championship. He would make the final squad and make his full international debut in the round-robin stage. Praplan helped Switzerland past the round-robin stage and contributed with 4 goals and 7 points in 8 games to finish in 6th place.

Career statistics

Regular season and playoffs

International

References

External links

1994 births
Living people
SC Bern players
EHC Kloten players
Ice hockey players at the 2018 Winter Olympics
Olympic ice hockey players of Switzerland
North Bay Battalion players
San Jose Barracuda players
People from Sierre
Springfield Thunderbirds players
Swiss ice hockey forwards
Sportspeople from Valais